The Hitler Line was a German defensive line in central Italy during the Second World War. The strong points of the line were at Piedmonte, Pontecorvo and Aquino. In May 1944, the line was renamed the Senger Line, after General von Senger und Etterlin, one of the generals commanding Axis forces in the area. This was done at Hitler's insistence, in order to minimize any propaganda significance should the line be penetrated.

The line was a so-called "switch line", joining the Gustav Line at Monte Cairo and providing a fall-back position behind the Gustav Line. The line was breached on 24 May 1944 on the British Eighth Army's front by the 1st Canadian Infantry Division and 5th Canadian Armoured Division, attacking with II Polish Corps on their right. First to breach the line, at Pontecorvo was 1st Canadian Division's 4th Princess Louise Dragoon Guards. The Polish Corps captured Piedimonte on 25 May and the line collapsed. The next German line was the Caesar C line.

External links
The Italian Campaign: Breaking the Hitler line – CBC Digital Archives – Medium-Radio/Program-CBC Radio News/ Broadcast Date-May 23, 1944
 https://web.archive.org/web/20060721024900/http://www.yorkshirevolunteers.org.uk/51RTR.htm

Italian campaign (World War II)
German World War II defensive lines
World War II sites in Italy